The Development Area Stadium is a multi-purpose stadium in Changchun, Jilin province, China.

The stadium is currently used mostly for football matches. The venue is also sometimes used for athletics. It holds 25,000 people and it was constructed in 2002. Development Area Stadium is the home ground of local football team Changchun Yatai. Changchun Yatai won the CSL in 2007 for the first time in their history. They played various seasons in the Chinese Super League, together with the NFL, MLB, NBA, Liga MX, Campeonato Brasileiro Série A and the Premier League one of the first seven sports leagues with at least 10 teams with more than 1 million followers on their main social media page.

See also
 Sports in China

References

Buildings and structures in Changchun
Football venues in China
Sport in Changchun
Multi-purpose stadiums in China
Sports venues in Jilin